Breweries in New Mexico produce a wide range of beers in different styles that are marketed locally and regionally. Brewing companies vary widely in the volume and variety of beer produced, from small nanobreweries and microbreweries to massive multinational conglomerate macrobreweries.

In 2012 New Mexico's 35 brewing establishments (including breweries, brewpubs, importers, and company-owned packagers and wholesalers) employed 90 people directly, and more than 6,400 others in related jobs such as wholesaling and retailing. Altogether 34 people in New Mexico had active brewer permits in 2012.

Including people directly employed in brewing, as well as those who supply New Mexico's breweries with everything from ingredients to machinery, the total business and personal tax revenue generated by New Mexico's breweries and related industries was more than $131 million. Consumer purchases of New Mexico's brewery products generated more than $69 million extra in tax revenue. In 2012, according to the Brewers Association, New Mexico ranked 12th in the number of craft breweries per capita with 27.

For context, at the end of 2013 there were 2,822 breweries in the United States, including 2,768 craft breweries subdivided into 1,237 brewpubs, 1,412 microbreweries and 119 regional craft breweries.  In that same year, according to the Beer Institute, the brewing industry employed around 43,000 Americans in brewing and distribution and had a combined economic impact of more than $246 billion.

Historic breweries

Breweries operated in various New Mexico towns during the late 1800s, though few survived until statewide Prohibition began in 1918. Some of the more notable breweries include:
Illinois Brewing Company (1882–1918) in Socorro. The company started as a liquor wholesaler before moving into brewing in the mid-1880s. After Prohibition, the company continued to produce ice and soft drinks until 1965. The former brewery is listed on the National Register of Historic Places and currently operates as a museum.
Southwestern Brewery and Ice Company (1888–1918) in Albuquerque. The brewery made various beers including the well-known Glorieta brand. The company did not return to brewing after Prohibition but continued to produce ice until 1997. The 1899 brewery building is still standing and is listed on the National Register of Historic Places.
New Mexico Brewing Company (1936–37) in Albuquerque. This was the only brewery to open in the post-Prohibition era, though it failed after less than a year. The brewery was auctioned and reopened as Rio Grande Brewing Company (1937–39). Also a short-lived venture, its products included Rio Grande Lager. The brewery building at 2nd and Marquette was converted to residential units and is still standing.

Breweries by location

Northern New Mexico
Abbey Brewing Company in Abiquiú
Red River Brewing Company in Red River

Santa Fe
Rowley Farmhouse Ales
Santa Fe Brewing Company

Central New Mexico

Albuquerque
Bosque Brewing Company
Bow & Arrow Brewing Company
Boxing Bear Brewing Company
Canteen Brewhouse (formerly Il Vicino Brewing Company) (additional taproom in Santa Fe)
Dialogue Brewing and Gallery
High & Dry Brewing Company
La Cumbre Brewing Company
Marble Brewery 
Nexus Brewery and Restaurant
Tractor Brewing Company
Sidetrack Brewing Company

Corrales
Ex Novo Brewing Company (additional location in Portland)

See also 

 Beer in the United States
 List of breweries in the United States
 List of microbreweries
 List of wineries in New Mexico

Notes

References

External links
 New Mexico Brewer's Guild
 List of breweries in New Mexico at BeerAdvocate (dynamic list)

New Mexico
Lists of buildings and structures in New Mexico